Charis Nicolaou (born March 31, 1974 in Nicosia, Cyprus) is a Cypriot football midfielder. He is a right-footed midfielder.

Career
Nicolaou made his debut for AC Omonia in 1995 at the age of nineteen. He had a successful career in Omonia with 299 appearances. In his last season in Omonia, 2005–06, he only made 9 appearances and then he moved to AEK Larnaca. He was one of the best young players introduced in a difficult season in Omonia.

External links
 
 UEFA - Euro 2008 qualifying - player profile

1974 births
AC Omonia players
AEK Larnaca FC players
Cypriot footballers
Cyprus international footballers
Association football midfielders
Living people
ASIL Lysi players